Luca Zinedine Zidane (born 13 May 1998) is a French professional footballer who plays as a goalkeeper for Segunda División club Eibar. He is the son of former footballer Zinedine Zidane.

Early life
Luca was born in Marseille, and is the son of the FIFA World Cup-winning French footballer Zinedine Zidane and his wife Veronique Fernández. He is the second of four brothers, and all of them – Enzo, Théo, and Elyaz – are footballers who developed at the youth academy of Real Madrid. Luca is of Spanish descent through his mother, and of Algerian descent through his father.

Club career
Luca joined the Real Madrid youth academy at the age of six in 2004 and plays as a goalkeeper. He worked his way up from the academy, eventually joining Castilla, the reserve team.

Luca's father Zinedine Zidane came to manage Real Madrid, and became Luca's manager early in his career. Luca made his professional debut for Real Madrid in their last league game of the 2017–18 season: a 2–2 La Liga tie with Villarreal CF on 19 May 2018. During the 2017–18 UEFA Champions League, he was the third-choice goalkeeper, when Madrid won their third consecutive and 13th overall Champions League title.

Luca was loaned to Racing Santander of Segunda División on 8 July 2019 for the 2019–20 season. He made his debut on 17 August 2019 in a 1–0 home loss to Málaga, in which he suffered an injury to the muscle on the back of his right leg.

On 5 October 2020, Luca joined Rayo Vallecano. He made his debut on 2 December, coming as substitute for Stole Dimitrievski who was sent off in a 1–0 loss to Leganés. When Dimitrievski played in UEFA Euro 2020 for North Macedonia, he played in all the remaining games of the season and led the team to promotion to the top flight after defeating Girona in the play-off final.

On 1 September 2022, free agent Luca signed a two-year contract with SD Eibar in the second division.

International career
Born in France to French-born parents of Algerian and Spanish descent, Luca is a youth international for France. He represented the France U17s in their winning campaign at the 2015 UEFA European Under-17 Championship, and the 2015 FIFA U-17 World Cup. He was capped once for the under-20s on 23 March 2018, in a 1–0 friendly loss to the United States in Spain. He remains available to represent the senior teams of France, Spain and Algeria, but has not decided which nations to represent.

Career statistics

Honours
France U17
UEFA European Under-17 Championship: 2015

See also
List of association football families

References

External links

1998 births
Living people
Footballers from Marseille
French footballers
Association football goalkeepers
Real Madrid CF players
Real Madrid Castilla footballers
Racing de Santander players
Rayo Vallecano players
SD Eibar footballers
Segunda División B players
Segunda División players
La Liga players
UEFA Champions League winning players
France youth international footballers
French expatriate footballers
Expatriate footballers in Spain
French expatriate sportspeople in Spain
French people of Kabyle descent
French people of Berber descent
French people of Spanish descent
Luca